The Paraty Bay, Paraty-Mirim and Saco do Mamanguá Environmental Protection Area is a municipal environmental protection area in the state of Rio de Janeiro, Brazil.

Location

The Paraty Bay, Paraty-Mirim and Saco do Mamanguá Environmental Protection Area (APA) is in the municipality of Paraty, Rio de Janeiro.
It is administered by the municipal department of the environment, fishing and agriculture.
It is part of the Bocaina Mosaic of conservation units.
The federally administered  Cairuçu Environmental Protection Area contains the APA.

The ecosystems in the APA are of great importance in maintaining the fishing resources and exceptional scenic beauty which attracts international tourists and contributes to the economy of the region.
Forbidden activities include bottom trawling, collection of shellfish for sale, any potentially polluting industries, and any other activities that would compromise maintenance of the ecosystems.
However, these prohibitions are not enforced.
As of 2016 the APA did not have a headquarters, management plan or managing council.

History

The Paraty Bay, Paraty-Mirim and Saco do Mamanguá Environmental Protection Area was created by municipal law 685 on 11 October 1984, and was resized by law 744 of 9 November 1987.
The objective is to protect the breeding areas of marine organisms in the municipality.

Notes

Sources

Environmental protection areas of Brazil
Protected areas of Rio de Janeiro (state)
1984 establishments in Brazil
Protected areas established in 1984